The Alam Group of Companies, commonly referred to as the Alam Group, is a privately owned conglomerate in Uganda. The group has business interests in Uganda, Kenya, and Rwanda.

History 
The Alam Group was founded by Manzur Alam in 1965. Alam built upon the foundations established by his father, Mehbub Alam, a civil engineer who worked closely with the Buganda government and local governments. Mehbub Alam's projects included the construction of Kigo Prison and Nakivubo Channel.

In 2019, the Group announced the construction of a new sugar factory in Kassanda district, Uganda. The factory is expected to begin production in early 2021.

Corporate affairs

Management 
The Alam Group is led by its founder and current chairman Manzur Alam.

Offices and employees 
The Alam Group is headquartered and runs the majority of companies in Uganda, where it directly employs over 3,000 people. It also maintains subsidiary companies in the neighboring countries of Kenya and Rwanda.

Business areas 
The Group is involved in steel manufacture, aluminum processing, agricultural implements, footwear, sugar manufacture, electricity generation, floriculture, real estate development and management, tourist lodges and motels and the manufacture of liquid petroleum gas, among other investments.

Subsidiary companies 
The companies of Alam Group include but are not limited to the following:
 Rolling Steel Mills – Jinja, Uganda 
 Saimmco Limited – Soroti, Uganda.
 Sugar & Allied Industries Limited – Kaliro, Uganda
 Kaliro Power Station – Kaliro, Uganda
 Crocodile Tool Company Limited – Jinja, Uganda 
 Alam Property Limited – Kampala, Uganda 
 Rhino Footwear Limited – Kampala, Uganda 
 Casements Africa Limited – Kampala, Uganda
 Roofclad Limited – Kampala, Uganda
 Oxygas Limited – Kampala, Uganda
 Kenya United Steel Company Limited (KUSCO) – Mombasa, Kenya
 Casements Africa Rwanda Limited – Kigali, Rwanda
 Geo Lodges Limited – Kampala, Uganda
 Ama Ply Limited – Kampala, Uganda
 Ekono Homes Limited – Kampala, Uganda

See also

 Uganda Conglomerates
 Africa Conglomerates
 UG Sugar Factories
 UG Power Stations
 Wealthy Ugandans

References

External links
  Alam Group Homepage

 
Conglomerate companies of Uganda
Companies based in Kampala